The commune of Mutaho is a commune of Gitega Province in central Burundi. The capital lies at Mutaho.

References

Communes of Burundi
Gitega Province